Montgiscard is a commune in the Haute-Garonne department of southwestern France.

Population

Twin towns
Montgiscard is twinned with:

  Campolongo Tapogliano, Italy, since 2005

See also
Communes of the Haute-Garonne department

References

Communes of Haute-Garonne